The Nepal Medical Council (NMC) is a statutory body regulating medical education and registration of doctors in Nepal.   

NMC was established in 1964 under Nepal Medical Council Act 1964. Chairman of NMC is nominated by Government of Nepal whereas Vice-Chairman is elected from NMC members. 

NMC is one of many statutory bodies related to Healthcare in Nepal. It mainly deals with code and conduct of medical doctors registered in this council. Other are Nepal Nursing Council, Nepal Pharmacy Council, Nepal Ayurvedic Medical Council, Nepal Health Professional Council, Nepal Health Research Council. The current chairman is Prof. Dr. Bhagawan Koirala.

Medical Education in Nepal 
There are 18 medical colleges in Nepal that award the MBBS degree. Nepal Medical Council (NMC) is the regulatory board that gives recognition to medical institutions for providing formal studies in medical science and training.

Kathmandu University (KU) and affiliated colleges 
 Kathmandu University, School of Medical Sciences (KUSMS), Dhulikhel, Kavre
 Manipal College of Medical Sciences (MCOMS), Pokhara, Kaski
 College of Medical Sciences (CMS), Bharatpur, Chitwan
 Kathmandu Medical College (KMC), Sinamangal, Kathmandu
 Nepal Medical College (NMC), Jorpati, Kathmandu
 Nepalgunj Medical College (NGMC), Chisapani, Nepalgunj
 Lumbini Medical College (LMC), Tansen, Palpa
 Nobel Medical College, Biratnagar
 Birat Medical college, Biratnagar
Devdaha Medical college,  Rupendehi

Tribhuvan University (TU) and affiliated colleges 
 Tribhuvan University, Institute of Medicine (IOM), Maharajgunj, Kathmandu
 Nepalese Army Institute of Health Sciences, College of Medicine, Kathmandu
 Universal College of Medical Sciences (UCMS), Bhairawaha
 National Medical College, Birgunj
 Janaki Medical College, Janakpur
 KIST Medical College, Imadol, Lalitpur
 Chitwan Medical College (CMC), Bharatpur, Chitwan
 Gandaki Medical College (GMCTHRC), Pokhara, Kaski
 Mahendranagar Medical College, Mahendranagar, Kanchanpur

Medical schools not affiliated to universities or having their own board 
 B.P. Koirala Institute of Health Sciences (BPKIHS), Ghopa, Dharan
 Patan Academy of Health Sciences (PAHS)-School of Medicine, Patan, Lalitpur
 Karnali Academy of Health Sciences (KAHS)-Jumla,Karnali
National Academy of Medical Sciences (NAMS), Kathmandu is an NMC-recognized medical college that has post-graduate residency (MD/MS) training programs but does not award MBBS degree.

See also
Nepal Nursing Council
Nepal Engineering Council

References

Education in Nepal
Regulatory agencies of Nepal
1964 establishments in Nepal